Events in the year 1188 in Norway.

Incumbents
Monarch: Sverre Sigurdsson

Events
December - The  revolt ends.

Arts and literature

Births

Deaths
26 January – Saint Eysteinn Erlendsson, archbishop (born c. 1120).

Full date unknown
Jon Kuvlung, pretender to the crown.

References

Norway